Ratz, officially the Movement for Civil Rights and Peace (Hebrew: , HaTnua'a LeZkhuyot HaEzrah VeLaShalom) was a left-wing political party in Israel that focused on human rights, civil rights, and women's rights. It was active from 1973 until its formal merger into Meretz in 1997. However, it remains a registered political party.

History
The Movement for Civil Rights and Peace was formed in 1973 by Shulamit Aloni, a former MK for the Alignment, 48 hours after she had left the party. As a member of the Israeli peace camp it opposed the occupation of the West Bank and Gaza strip and called for a peace settlement with the Palestine Liberation Organization from its birth. The party advocated secularism, the separation of religion and state, and civil rights, most notably women's rights, a topic that was very close to Aloni. It was also a notable fighter against corruption and for a written constitution, and Aloni was the initiator of the Knesset sub-committee for basic laws (Israel's equivalent of a constitution). For a while it also supported electoral reform.

In its first test, the 1973 elections, the party won 2.2% of the vote and three seats in the Knesset, which were taken by Aloni, new American immigrant Marcia Freedman, and Boaz Moav. The party soon gained the popular name Ratz, as it used the letters Resh-Tzadik on the election ballot paper. Following Golda Meir's resignation, the party joined Yitzhak Rabin's government and Aloni served as a minister without portfolio. This was one of the few periods in Israel's political history when no religious parties were part of the coalition. The arrangement lasted for a few months only and when the National Religious Party joined the coalition, Ratz left it.

In 1975 the party merged with Aryeh Eliav, an independent MK who had broken away from the Alignment, to form a new party, Ya'ad – Civil Rights Movement. However, it broke up the following year, and Aloni and Moaz reformed Ratz. Freedman did not return, instead forming the Social-Democratic Faction (later renamed the Independent Socialist Faction) with Eliav, and then breaking away again to form the Women's Party prior to the 1977 elections. Also prior to the 1977 elections, the Independent Socialist Faction merged with several other small left-wing parties (Moked, Meri and the Black Panthers) to form the Left Camp of Israel.

Ratz performed poorly in the '77 elections, winning only one seat, which Aloni took. The 1981 elections were a repeat, with only Aloni representing the party in the Knesset. During the Knesset session she merged the party into the Alignment, but then broke away again before the term ended.

Before the 1984 elections the Left Camp of Israel merged into Ratz in a one-to-three ratio, bringing with them Ran Cohen among others. The elections were an improvement on the previous two, and saw the party win three seats. During the Knesset session, the party gained another two seats when Yossi Sarid and Mordechai Virshubski joined the party, defecting from the Alignment and Shinui respectively. The party retained its five-seat strength in the 1988 elections.

Prior to the 1992 elections, the party formed an alliance with Mapam and Shinui named Meretz, whilst keeping their independent status within the union. The new party was a success, winning 12 seats, two more than the parties had held in the previous Knesset. Prior to the 1996 elections Aloni finally lost the leadership of the party, defeated by Sarid in internal elections. She retired from politics immediately. In 1997 the merger was made official (though several Shinui members led by Avraham Poraz broke away to reform as an independent party, whilst David Zucker became an independent MK), and Ratz effectively ceased to exist. However, it remained a registered political party and submitted financial reports to the Party Registrar in 2010 and 2013.

Election results

Knesset Members

References

External links
Party history Knesset website

Political parties established in 1973
Political parties disestablished in 1997
Defunct political parties in Israel
Zionist political parties in Israel
Liberal socialism
Anti-clerical parties
Labor Zionism